This is a list of some of the most significant artworks at the Indianapolis Museum of Art (IMA). The museum's collection has always been very strong in 19th-century European and American paintings, particularly Neo-Impressionism, and textiles. Generous donations helped the IMA develop impressive holdings in modernist, African, and Asian art. Recently, the IMA has begun to focus on developing its collections of contemporary art and design.

References

 
Culture of Indianapolis
artworks at the Indianapolis Museum of Art